The Team of Winter Generation (Komanda Ozimogo Pokolinnja) was an electoral alliance in Ukraine.
At the parliamentary elections on 30 March 2002, the alliance won 2.0% of the popular vote and no seats.

The alliance had the following members:
 Constitutional Democratic Party (Konstitucijno-Demokratyčna Partija)
 Liberal Democratic Party of Ukraine (Liberal'no Demokratuyčna Partija Ukrajiny)
 Party of Private Property (Partija Privatnoi Vlasnosti)
 Ukrainian Peasant Democratic Party (Ukrajins'ka Selkans'ka Demokratyčna Partija)

Team of Winter Generation strongly resembled the successful 1999 electoral campaign of the Russian Union of Right Forces. The total expenditure of the campaign was estimated at about $15 million. The party focused on creating a liberal, youthful image. Non-members could win a place on the party list by winning a TV-show on ICTV. The party score was not better in its target group then in other age groups.

Top 10 members
 Valeriy Khoroshkovsky, member of parliament, unaffiliated
 Inna Bohoslovska, member of parliament, Constitutional Democratic Party
 Mykola Sytnyk (Veresen), unemployed, unaffiliated
 Ostap Protsyk, director of Agency for the European integration, unaffiliated
 Valeriy Voshchevsky, leader of Ukrainian Peasant Democratic Party
 Iryna Horina, commerce director of "Faktor-5", Liberal Democratic Party of Ukraine
 Vadym Hurzhos, chairman of supervising council for "Galakton", Party of Private Property
 Lev Khlyavych, deputy chairman of "Ukrinmedstrakh", Liberal Democratic Party of Ukraine
 Bohdan Shevchuk, general director (acting) of Agro-Industrial Complex "Pivdennyi", unaffiliated
 Yevhen Podosyonov, vice-president of LAZ, unaffiliated

References

External links
 List of the electoral bloc members (Ukrainian Pravda)
 Party description at the Political compass of a voter

Defunct political party alliances in Ukraine